John Frank Ford (born 14 January 1952) is a retired British Anglican bishop. From 2013 to 2019 he was the Bishop of The Murray in the Anglican Church of Australia. From 2005 to 2013, he was the Bishop of Plymouth, a suffragan see in the Diocese of Exeter, England.

Early life
Ford was educated at the Southampton College of Technology. From 1976 to 1979, he studied for ordination at Chichester Theological College.

Ordained ministry
Ford was ordained in the Church of England as a deacon in 1979 and as a priest in 1980. He began his career with a curacy at Christ Church, Forest Hill after which he was Vicar of St Augustine's Lee and then domestic chaplain to the Bishop of Horsham. From 1994 to 2000, he served as diocesan missioner for the Diocese of Chichester. From 2000 to 2005, he was a residentiary canon and precentor of Chichester Cathedral.

Episcopal ministry
On 13 December 2005, Ford was consecrated a bishop at Exeter Cathedral by Rowan Williams, the then Archbishop of Canterbury. He served as Bishop of Plymouth, a suffragan bishop in the Diocese of Exeter, between 2005 and 2013. From 2011 to 2013, he also held the post of assistant bishop in the Diocese of Truro.

On 30 June 2013, Ford was announced as the next diocesan bishop of the Diocese of The Murray in South Australia. He was installed as the fourth Bishop of The Murray on 6 December 2013. He retired in 2019 and returned to England to live in the Diocese of Chichester. He has a permission to officiate in the Diocese in Europe.

Ford is a member of The Society, an association of traditionalist Anglo-Catholics in the Church of England who reject on theological grounds the ordination of women as priests and bishops.

Personal life
Ford is a keen cricket fan. He is married to Bridget. They have three children.

Styles
 The Reverend John Ford (1980–1997)
 The Reverend Canon John Ford (1997–2005)
 The Right Reverend John Ford (2005–present)

References

1952 births
Alumni of Chichester Theological College
Alumni of Solent University
21st-century Church of England bishops
Anglican bishops of Plymouth
Living people
Place of birth missing (living people)
Anglican bishops of The Murray
Anglo-Catholic bishops